
Gmina Blachownia is an urban-rural gmina (administrative district) in Częstochowa County, Silesian Voivodeship, in southern Poland.

The gmina contains part of the protected area called Upper Liswarta Forests Landscape Park.

Villages
Apart from the town of Blachownia, Gmina Blachownia contains the villages and settlements of Kolonia Łojki, Konradów, Łojki and Wyrazów.

Neighbouring gminas
Gmina Blachownia is bordered by the city of Częstochowa and by the gminas of Herby, Konopiska and Wręczyca Wielka.

References

Blachownia
Częstochowa County